Andru Kanda Mugam is a 1968 Indian Tamil-language thriller film, directed and produced by G. Ramakrishnan. Music was by K. V. Mahadevan. The film stars Ravichandran and Jayalalithaa, with S. A. Ashokan, Nagesh, Manorama, V. K. Ramasamy and Major Sundarrajan in supporting roles. It was released on 15 January 1968.

Plot

Cast 
 Ravichandran as Rajendran
 Jayalalithaa as Kanchana
 S. A. Ashokan as Advocate Aathmanathan
 Nagesh as Subbusami
 Manorama as Devi
 V. K. Ramasamy as Somasundaram
 Major Sundarrajan as Selvanayagam
 C. R. Parthiban
 Suruli Rajan as Head Constable
 Gemini Balu as Prabhakaran
 S. Rama Rao as Neelakanta Sasthri
 Usilai Mani as Kanchana's paternal uncle
 S. Paravathi as Kanchana's aunt
 K. R. Indira Devi
 Justin
 Viswanathan

Soundtrack 
Music was composed by K. V. Mahadevan and lyrics were written by Kannadasan.

Reception 
Kalki said that though so many things were running, the film itself was not.

References

External links 

1960s Tamil-language films
1960s thriller films
1968 films
Films scored by K. V. Mahadevan
Films set in the Indian independence movement
Films shot in Ooty
Indian black-and-white films
Indian thriller films